Gulistan, also spelled as Golestan (Pashto/Persian: گلستان), is a district in Farah Province, Afghanistan. Its population, which is approximately 55% Pashtun and 45% Tajik, was estimated at 53,780 in October 2004. The district has a total of 109 villages. The main village, also called Gulistan, is situated at 1434 m altitude in the mountainous part of the district. The main road through the district is Route 522.

War in Afghanistan
In September 2005, Taliban fighters briefly gained control of the district from Afghan security forces after heavy fighting.

In May 2019, Taliban forces attacked a checkpoint in the district, killing 20 Afghan fighters and abducting 2.

References

External links

 Map of Gulistan (PDF)

Districts of Farah Province